Blonde Cobra is a 1963 short film directed by experimental filmmaker Ken Jacobs. Footage for the unique and at the time controversial film was shot by Bob Flieshner. Marc Siegel states that the 33-minute film is "generally considered to be one of the masterpieces of the New York underground film scene", and that it is a "fascinating audio-visual testament to the tragicomic performance of the inimitable Jack Smith", who was a photographer and filmmaker and "queer muse" in New York avant-garde art in the 1960s and 1970s.

Synopsis
The film captures Smith wearing dresses and makeup, playing with dolls, and smoking marijuana. Paul Arthur writes that the film contains "dizzying quasi-autobiographical rants" which spin on sadism, and that like Jacobs' Little Stabs at Happiness, it contains "languid improvisations studded with the bare bones of narrative incident or, more accurately, its collapse". The film contains Smith droning and singing and wildly cooing and cackling in parts of the film. The "lonely little boy" episode about a little boy living in a large house with 10 rooms has been cited as being "potentially repugnant to many viewers" because of its exploration of sadism against children and childhood sexuality. In this episode the narrator confesses to have "blown up the penis" of a 7-year-old boy with a match. The film contains numerous other elements which were shocking at the time of release such as references to necrophilia, the use of the word "cunt", the confession of a nun (impersonated in a posh high-pitched voice by Smith) to lesbianism, the holding of a giant would-be dildo, and a portrayal of transvestites. The film features quotes such as "Why shave when I can't think of a reason for living" and "life is a sad business", quoting Greta Garbo. "Let's Call the Whole Thing Off" is then played, described as a "burlesque rendering" of Robert Siodmak's 1944 film Cobra Woman. The last scene captures Smith stabbing a man in the chest. Hilary Radner and Moya Luckett consider the film to be a camp portrayal of Rose Hobart.

See also
 List of American films of 1963
 Jack Smith and the Destruction of Atlantis, a 2006 documentary film about the filmmaker himself

References

External links
 Blonde Cobra at the Film-Makers' Cooperative
 
Blonde Cobra at Rotten Tomatoes

1963 films
American LGBT-related short films
1960s avant-garde and experimental films
1963 short films
1963 LGBT-related films
Films directed by Ken Jacobs
Cross-dressing in American films
American black-and-white films
1960s English-language films
1960s American films